Kangiqtualuk Agguqti (Inuktitut syllabics: ᑲᖏᖅᑐᐊᓗᒃ ᐊᒡᒍᖅᑎ) formerly Walker Arm is a tributary fjord of the Kangiqtualuk Uqquqti located on the northeast coast of Baffin Island in the Qikiqtaaluk Region in Nunavut, Canada.

References  

Bodies of water of Baffin Island
Fjords of Qikiqtaaluk Region